Feenstra is a Dutch (originally Frisian) toponymic surname. It is a spelling variant of Veenstra and equivalent to the surnames Van der Veen and Van Veen. Notable people with the surname include:

Katie Feenstra (born 1982), American basketball player
Kim Feenstra (born 1985), Dutch model
Randall M. Feenstra (born 1956), physicist
Randy Feenstra (born 1969), American politician from Iowa
Rienk Feenstra (1920–2005), Dutch philatelist
Robert Feenstra (born 1956), American economist

See also
Kirchberg v. Feenstra, a 1981 United States Supreme Court case

Surnames of Frisian origin